Zotovsky is a rural locality (a khutor) in Kalmykovskoye Rural Settlement, Kletsky District, Volgograd Oblast, Russia. The population was 209 as of 2010. There are 6 streets.

Geography 
Zotovsky is located in steppe, on the Krepkaya River, 43 km southwest of Kletskaya (the district's administrative centre) by road. Kalmykovsky is the nearest rural locality.

References 

Rural localities in Kletsky District